Bicho may refer to:

 Bicho (album), by Caetano Veloso, 1977
 Bicho (food), the common Tagalog name for youtiao, a type of fried dough
 Bicho (woreda), Oromia, Ethiopia
 Bicho (footballer, born 1992), Spanish footballer (Xerez)
 Bicho (footballer, born 1996), Spanish footballer (Deportivo La Coruña, Compostela)
 Bicho (footballer, born 2003), Spanish women's footballer (Atlético Madrid)